is a Japanese artist. He currently lives and works in Kyoto.
Co-founder and visual creator of the group Dumb Type since 1984, he also became artistic director of the group from 1995 and also started an active solo career in 1998.

Biography

Dumb Type 
Graduated from Kyoto City University of Arts, Shiro Takatani co-founded Dumb Type in 1984 with other students from different sections of the university, including Teiji Furuhashi, Toru Koyamada, Yukihiro Hozumi, Misako Yabuuchi and Hiromasa Tomari.

Dumb Type began touring around the world and got recognition with their multidisciplinary shows Pleasure Life (1988), and pH (1990–1995) and S/N (1992–1996)

After the death of the artistic director Teiji Furuhashi in 1995, some members left the company, while new ones joined it, as the composer Ryoji Ikeda. They continued working under Shiro Takatani's direction and created the performances OR (1997–1999), memorandum (1999–2003), Voyage (2002–2009), and the related installations OR (1997), Cascade (2000), Voyages (2002) and MEMORANDUM OR VOYAGE (2014).

Solo Projects 
Alongside his activities within Dumb Type, Takatani has created a number of installations and performances under his own name.

Since his first installation frost frames, created at Canon Artlab in 1998, Takatani has been invited by museums, festivals and theatres worldwide.

Among others, he was commissioned by the Natural History Museum of Latvia in Riga to create two video installations: Ice Core and Snow Crystal / fiber optic type, for the group exhibition "Conversations with Snow and Ice", dedicated to Ukichiro Nakaya' scientific work on snow and ice, in 2005. This exhibition was one of the nominees for the Descartes Award for Excellence in the Explanation of Scientific phenomena in 2007) 

The following year he was hosted in residence in Australia and presented the installation Chrono in Melbourne, as part of the Australia-Japan exchange program "Rapt! 20 Contemporary Artists from Japan", commissioned by the Japan Foundation.

He also joined the three-week British expedition "Cape Farewell" (a cultural response to climate change) in the Arctic, with scientists, writers, journalists and other artists from different countries. The related group exhibition was presented at the National Museum of Emerging Science and Innovation in Tokyo, in 2008.

His more recent creations include the laser installation Silence (2012), commissioned by Radar, Loughborough University Arts, the fog installation Composition (2013) for the Sharjah Biennial in the United Arab Emirates and one of the first animation artworks for the 3D WATER MATRIX, inaugurated at the exhibition "Robotic Art" at the Cité des sciences et de l'industrie in Paris, in 2014.

Some of his installations are part of permanent collections of museums, for example Camera lucida (2004) and Toposcan / Ireland 2013 at the Tokyo Metropolitan Museum of Photography and optical flat / fiber optic type (2000) at the National Museum of Art in Osaka.

In 2013, the Tokyo Metropolitan Museum of Photography presented Camera lucida, a dedicated exhibition with a wide range of the video and photographic artworks, he created both as solo artist and artistic director of Dumb Type

Another solo exhibition, held at the Kodama Gallery in Tokyo in 2014, featured his photographic series Topograph and frost frame Europe 1987.

Takatani also created and directed three theatre/dance performances: La chambre claire  (2008), referring to Roland Barthes's essay la camera lucida, CHROMA (2012), inspired by Derek Jarman's Chroma: A Book of Color, with original music by Simon Fisher Turner, and ST/LL (2015)  in which he is exploring how to consider the micromeasure of time and whether "art or science can ever truly express this hourglass world".

Collaboration Projects 
Shiro Takatani has collaborated with musicians, choreographers and other artists from many disciplines.

In 1990, he participated with Akira Asada in the art project Stadsmarkeringen Groningen - Marking the City Boundaries, led by architect Daniel Libeskind for the 950th anniversary of the City of Groningen in the Netherlands.

In 1998, he was commissioned by Art Zoyd and the Lille National Orchestra to create video images for a piece of the first cycle of Dangerous Visions, a project combining symphonic music, new musical technologies and images.

At this period, composer Ryuichi Sakamoto noticed Takatani's work and asked him to undertake the visual direction of his opera LIFE, created in 1999. This marked the start of a fruitful collaboration between the two artists.
They co-created later, in 2007, the installation LIFE - fluid, invisible, inaudible ... at Yamaguchi Center for Arts and Media [YCAM] (as well as an updated version in 2013), silent spins with sound designer Seigen Ono at the Museum of Contemporary Art in Tokyo in 2012. 
They also participated together in three performances directed by Moriaki Watanabe: Project Mallarmé I, II and III, combining text, music, theatre and dance, at the Kyoto Performing Arts Center - Shunjuza, from 2010 to 2012.
During 2013–2014, they presented in Yamaguchi Center for Arts and Media [YCAM], on the occasion of its 10th anniversary, their performance LIFE WELL (with the participation of Noh actor Mansai Nomura), an installation with the same title and a new one: water state 1.
Furthermore, Takatani was the visual director for Sakamoto's project Forest Symphony in 2013 and they collaborated again for a special version of LIFE-WELL, commissioned for the 20th anniversary of the Park Hyatt in Tokyo, in 2014.

Since his first collaboration with fog sculptor Fujiko Nakaya at the 1st International Biennial of Valencia in 2001, for the outdoor installation IRIS at the port of the city, Takatani co-signed two more large-scale installations with her: CLOUD FOREST (2010), inside and around the Yamaguchi Center for Arts and Media [YCAM], and a fog sculpture in the Asuka Historical National Park in Nara.

Among other collaborations, he contributed in the exhibition Kichizaemon X (2012–2013), consisting of images screened on potters made by Raku Kichizaemon XV at Sagawa Art Museum, and he co-signed the 4K video installation Mars with Xavier Barral, for the international festival of photography Kyotographie at the Museum of Kyoto.

He also co-created several performances with Noh actor Mansai Nomura: Sanbaso / Eclipse and Boléro, both performed at the MOT - Museum of Contemporary Art Tokyo), and Aoi no ue, The Double Shadow, directed by Watanabe Moriaki, at the Kyoto Performing Arts Center - Syunjuza.

Takatani's works were presented, among others, at the Martin-Gropius-Bau in Berlin, Israel Museum in Jerusalem, Romaeuropa festival / MACRO in Rome, Royal Academy of Arts in London, Musée d'art contemporain de Lyon, GREC festival in Barcelona, Festival de Otoño in Madrid, Museum of Contemporary Art Tokyo, Lille 2004 - European Capital of Culture, NTT InterCommunication Center - ICC, Tokyo, Yamaguchi Center for Arts and Media [YCAM].

In 2015, Takatani received the 65th Prize of Fine Arts (Art media) from the Ministry of Education of Japan.

Works

Installations  
 Toposcan/Tokyo (2020), commissioned by Tokyo Photographic Art Museum
 Toposcan / Baden-Württemberg (2016), commissioned by ZKM Karlsruhe
 MEMORANDUM OR VOYAGE - Dumb Type (2014), commissioned by the Museum of Contemporary Art Tokyo
 ST\LL, a liquid animation for the 3D WATER MATRIX (2014)
 Toposcan/Morocco (2014)
 Toposcan/Ireland (2013)
 frost frame Europe 1987 (2013)
 mirror type k2 (2013)
 Composition (2013)
 silence (2012)
 photo-gene (2007)
 Chrono (2006), commissioned by the Japan Foundation as part of Australia-Japan exchange program "Rapt! 20 Contemporary Artists from Japan"
 Ice Core (2005), commissioned by the Natural History Museum of Latvia, Riga, as part of "Conversations with Snow and Ice" exhibition
 Snow Crystal / fiber optic type (2005), commissioned by the Natural History Museum of Latvia, Riga, as part of "Conversations with Snow and Ice" exhibition
 Camera Lucida (2004), permanent collection of Tokyo Metropolitan Museum of Photography
 optical flat / fiber optic type (2000), permanent collection of the National Museum of Art, Osaka
 frost frames (1998)

Performances 
 ST/LL (2015), co-produced by Le Volcan - Scène Nationale du Havre, France, Biwako Hall - Center for the Performing Arts, Shiga, Japan, and Fondazione Campania dei Festival – Napoli Teatro Festival Italia
 CHROMA - concert version (2013)
 CHROMA (2012), co-produced by Biwako Hall - Center for the Performing Arts, Shiga 
 La chambre claire (2008), co-produced by Theater der Welt 2008

Collaboration works 
 Fujiko Nakaya:Fog x FLO, fog installation (2018)
 Ryuichi Sakamoto: dis.play, visual concert (2018)
 Glenn Gould Gathering (2017)
 Ryuichi Sakamoto: IS YOUR TIME exhibition (2017)
 Ryuichi Sakamoto: Artists Studio, visual concert (2017)
 Ryuichi Sakamoto: async exhibition (2017)
 London Fog #03779, fog installation with Fujiko Nakaya + Ryuichi Sakamoto + Min Tanaka at the Tate Modern London (2017)
 Sayuri Yoshinaga + Ryuichi Sakamoto: For Peace, charity concert (2016)
 Toposcan/Mozuyaguro - Rokyo with Raku Kichizaemon XV + Chojiro (2016)
 Le Soulier de satin by Paul Claudel, directed by Moriaki Watanabe (2016) 
 PLANKTON - A Drifting World at the Origine of Life: installation with Christian Sardet and Ryuichi Sakamoto (2016)
 Aoi no ue / L'ombre double (2014), visual direction for the performance directed by Moriaki Watanabe (Kyoto Performing Arts Center - Syunjuza)
 LIFE-WELL Park Hyatt version (2014), fog and sound installation in collaboration with Ryuichi Sakamoto, at Park Hyatt Tokyo 
 ST\LL, First artwork for the 3D Water Matrix (2014), Merit CODAawards Winner 2015 - category "Institutional" in 2015
 Mars (2014), installation in collaboration with Xavier Barral 
 Sanbaso / Eclipse (2014), with Mansai Nomura, commissioned by the Museum of Contemporary Art Tokyo
 Boléro (2014), with Mansai Nomura, commissioned by the Museum of Contemporary Art Tokyo
 LIFE - fluid, invisible, inaudible ... (2013), ver.2, installation with Ryuichi Sakamoto, commissioned by Yamaguchi Center for Arts and Media [YCAM]
 water state 1 (2013), installation with Ryuichi Sakamoto 
 LIFE-WELL (2013), installation with Ryuichi Sakamoto 
 Forest Symphony (2013), visual direction for the project by Ryuichi Sakamoto
 LIFE-WELL (2013), Nô and Kyôgen performance in collaboration with Ryuichi Sakamoto and Mansai Nomura 
 Mallarmé Project III (2012), visual direction for the performance by Moriaki Watanabe 
 silence spins (2012), installation with Ryuichi Sakamoto + Seigen Ono 
 collapsed (2012), installation with Ryuichi Sakamoto
 Kichizaemon X (2012), installation with Raku Kichizaemon XV
 Asuka Art Project (2011), lighting design for the fog installation by Fujiko Nakaya
 Mallarmé Project II - Igitur (2011), visual direction for the performance by Moriaki Watanabe 
 Mallarmé Project (2010), visual direction for the performance by Moriaki Watanabe
 CLOUD FOREST (2010), installation with Fujiko Nakaya, commissioned by Yamaguchi Center for Arts and Media [YCAM]
 This is how you will disappear, video direction for the performance by Gisèle Vienne at Festival d'Avignon
 Keiichiro Shibuya playing piano solo, Shiro Takatani playing visuals (2009) 
 LIFE-fluid, invisible, inaudible ... (2007), installation with Ryuichi Sakamoto, commissioned by Yamaguchi Center for Arts and Media [YCAM]
 Live with Softpad (2007), special creation at Espace Sculfort in Maubeuge and Maison des Arts de Créteil
 Garden Live with Ryuichi Sakamoto (2007) at Daitokuji-temple, Kyoto
 Live with Rei Harakami (2006) at Liquidroom, Tokyo, Sonar Sound Tokyo
 Live with Rei Harakami (2005) at Kyoto University Seibu-Kodo Hall and SONAR, Barcelona
 Garden Live with Ryuichi Sakamoto (2005) at Honen-in, Kyoto
 Live with Rei Harakami (2004) at Namura Art Meeting, Osaka and Sonar Sound Tokyo 2004
 IRIS (2001), installation with Fujiko Nakaya, commissioned by the 1st Biennial of Valencia 
 LIFE (1999), visual direction for the opera by Ryuichi Sakamoto
 Dangerous Visions (1998), visual creation for the project by Art Zoyd and Orchestre National de Lille

 Exhibitions and Performances 

 Solo exhibitions 
2019-2020
 Dumb Type : ACTIONS+REFLEXIONS, MOT - Museum of Contemporary Art Tokyo 
 Topograph/Toposcan, Kodama Gallery Tokyo (JP)
2018
 Dumb Type : ACTIONS+REFLEXIONS, Centre Pompidou-Metz
2014
 Topograph and frost frame Europe 1987, Kodama Gallery, Tokyo 
2013
 Camera Lucida, Tokyo Photographic Art Museum
 LIFE-WELL installation, Noda-jinja shrine (outdoor), Yamaguchi
2007
 photo-gene, Kodama Gallery, Tokyo
2004
 Camera Lucida - experimental studies, Kodama Gallery, Osaka
2001
 frost frames, Chapelle des Carmélites, Toulouse
2000
 frost frames, Kyoto Art Center, Kyoto
 optical flat / fiber optic type, Kodama Gallery, Osaka

 Group exhibitions 
2017
 Digitalife 8, Romaeuropa Festival, Rome 
 Reenacting History Collective Actions and Everyday Gestures, National Museum of Modern and Contemporary Art 
 Polar Patterns | Art and Antarctica, RMIT Project Space Gallery, Melbourne
2016
 Digitalife 7, Romaeuropa / MACRO Testaccio - La Pelanda, Rome 
 Le Grand Orchestre des Animaux / Fondation Cartier pour l'art contemporain, Paris
 GLOBALE: New Sensorium / ZKM, Karlsruhe
2015
 Open Space / NTT InterCommunication Center [ICC], Tokyo
2014
 Seeking New Genealogies — Bodies / Leaps / Traces, Museum of Contemporary Art, Tokyo
 City and Nature / Sapporo International Art Festival, Hokkaido Museum of Modern Art, Sapporo
 Kyotographie - international photography festival / The Museum of Kyoto Annex 
 Art Robotique / Cité des sciences et de l'industrie, Paris 
2013
 ART-ENVIRONMENT-LIFE - YCAM 10th Anniversary, Yamaguchi Center for Arts and Media [YCAM]
  Re:emerge, Towards a New Cultural Cartography" - Sharjah Biennial 11 / Sharjah Art Foundation New Art Spaces, Sharjah
 Kichizaemon X, special exhibition "teahouse of light" / Sagawa Art Museum, Shiga
 Kyotographie - international photography festival / Saigyo-an, Kyoto
2012
 AfterGold / Radar, Loughborough University
 Kichizaemon X: Takatani Shiro + the 15th Raku Kichizaemon / Sagawa Art Museum, Shiga
 Art & Music - Search for New Synesthesia / Museum of Contemporary Art Tokyo, Tokyo
2011
 Matière-Lumière / Le 360, Bethune
2010
 Digital Life / Romaeuropa, La Pelanda-MACRO, Rome
 Yebisu International Festival for Art & Alternative Visions / Tokyo Metropolitan Museum of Photography, Tokyo
2009
 Ecology and Art – Thinking About the Earth Through Art: From Nearby to Far Away / Gunma Museum of Art, Tatebayashi
 A Blow to the Everyday / Osage Gallery, Hong Kong
 Earth: Art of a changing world / Royal Academy of Arts, London
2008
 Cape Farewell / National Museum of Emerging Science and Innovation, Tokyo
 Light InSight / NTT InterCommunication Center [ICC], Tokyo
2007
 Vom Funken zum Pixel / Martin-Gropius-Bau, Berlin
2006
 Rapt! 20 contemporary artists from Japan / Westspace, Melbourne
2005
 Conversations with Snow and Ice / The Natural History Museum of Latvia, Riga
 Rising Sun, Melting Moon / The Israel Museum, Jerusalem
2003
 Cyber Asia – media art in the near future / Hiroshima City Museum of Contemporary Art, Hiroshima
 Lille 2004 – European Capital of Culture, Lille
2001
 media messages: look thru language / Sendai mediatheque, Sendai
 AFTER-IMAGE / The National Museum of Art, Osaka
2000
 Musiques en Scène Festival / Musée d'art contemporain de Lyon
 EXIT Festival / Maison des Arts de Créteil
 VIA Festival / Le Manège - Théâtre du Manège, Maubeuge
1998
 ARTLAB 4 / Spiral Garden, Tokyo
1990
 Stadsmarkering - Groningen / Marking the City Boundaries (master plan Daniel Libeskind), Groningen

Public collections 
 optical flat / fiber optic type (2000), The National Museum of Art, Osaka
 Toposcan – Ireland (2013), Tokyo Metropolitan Museum of Photography, Tokyo
 Camera Lucida (2004), Tokyo Metropolitan Museum of Photography, Tokyo

Tours (performances) 
2019
 ST/LL, Leisure and Cultural Services Department, Kwai Tsing Theatre, Hong Kong
 ST/LL, Singapore International Festival of Arts
2018
 ST/LL, New National Theatre Tokyo
2017
 ST/LL, National Performing Arts Center, National Theater & Concert Hall, Taipei
 CHROMA, One Dance Week Festival, Plovdiv
2016
 ST/LL, Napoli Teatro Festival 2016 - Teatro Politeama, Naples  
 CHROMA, New National Theatre Tokyo
 ST/LL, Biwako Hall - Center for the Performing Arts, Shiga
2015
 ST/LL, Les Halles de Schaerbeek, Brussels
 ST/LL, Le Volcan - Scène Nationale du Havre, Le Havre
2014
 CHROMA, SIAF - Sapporo International Art Festival
2013
 CHROMA, Festival de Marseille
 CHROMA concert version, SonarSound Tokyo
2012
 CHROMA, Biwako Hall - Center for the Performing Arts, Shiga
 La chambre claire, New National Theatre, Tokyo
2010	
 La Càmera Lúcida, GREC Festival, Barcelone
 La chambre claire, Festival de Marseille
 La chambre claire, Biwako Hall - Center for the Performing Arts, Shiga
2009
 La Cámara Lúcida, Festival de Otoño, Madrid
2008
 Die Helle Kammer, Theater der Welt, Halle

Discography 
 Teiji Furuhashi + Toru Yamanaka + Dumb Type - Works Vol. 01 (Triple CD, 2005). Foil Records FR-008/3
 memorandum - Dumb Type (CD, 2000). CCI Recording CCI001
 OR - Dumb Type (CD, 1998). Foil Records DTOR
 S/N (CD, 1998). Les Disques du Soleil et de l'Acier C-DSA 54056
 Remix - Dumb Type (mini CD, 1997). Foil Records FS001
 teiji furuhashi / dumb type 1985–1994 (CD, 1996). Foil Records ML8852008
 Hotel Pro Forma, Dumb Type, Diller-Scofidio - Monkey Business Class (CD, 1996). no label. Audio document of a collaboration between Hotel Pro Forma, Dumb Type, Elizabeth Diller, Ricardo Scofidio and Willie Flindt.
 S/N - Dumb Type (CD, 1995). Newsic 30CE-N022

Videography 
 memorandum (DVD, 2009). Dumb Type's performance recorded in 2000. Commmons RZBM46410
 OR (DVD, 2009). Dumb Type's performance recorded in 1998. Commmons RZBM46409
 LIFE-fluid, invisible, inaudible ... (DVD, 2008). Ryuichi Sakamoto + Shiro Takatani. Commmons RZBM-46410
 OR (VHS, 1998). Dumb Type's performance recorded in 1997. Euro Space ESV-034
 pH (VHS, 1992). Dumb Type performance recorded in 1991. Euro Space ESV-033

Awards 
 "65th Prize of Fine Arts" (Art media) from the Ministry of Education of Japan (2015)
 "Merit CODAawards Winner 2015" (Institutional) for the 3D Water Matrix featuring Takatani's special artwork (2015)
 "Sole d'Ora" / TTVV Riccione (Italy) for Dumb Type video pH (1992)
 "Best Stage Recording / Studio Adaptation" / IMZ - Alter Oper, Dance Screen '92 Frankfurt (Germany) for Dumb Type video pH (1992)

Bibliography

Books 
 Beyond the Display, Phenomenal Art and Design in the 21st Century, Mika Iwasaka (2015). [Shiro Takatani - CHROMA, pp. 144–145, Ryuichi Sakamoto + Shiro Takatani - water state 1, pp. 174–175]. Ed. BNN, inc. 
 From Postwar to Postmodern, Art in Japan, 1945–1989: Primary Documents (MoMa Primary Documents), Doryun Chong, Michio Hayashi, Fumihiko Sumitomo, Kenji Kajiya (editors) (2012). The Museum of Modern Art, New York. Ed. Duke University Press Books. 
 LIFE -TXT, Ryuichi Sakamoto + Shiro Takatani (2010). Ed. NTT Publishing. 
 Seeing Witness: Visuality and the Ethics of Testimony, Jane Blocker (2009). [Machine Memory: Digital Witness in Dumb Type's memorandum, pp. 61–84]. Ed. The University of Minnesota Press. 
 Art And Electronic Media, Edward A. Shanken (2009). [pp. 148–149]. Ed. Phaidon
 Performing Japan: Contemporary Expressions of Cultural Identity (2008). [Yuji Sone, Internalizing Digital Phenomena: The performing' body at the intersection of Japanese culture and technology, pp. 273–294]. Ed. Global Oriental. 
 Digital Performance: A History of New Media in Theater, Dance, Performance Art, and Installation, Steve Dixon (2007). [pp. 13, 60, 524, 661, 228–230, 547–548, 226–227, 60–61, 227–228]. Ed. The MIT Press. 
 Susan Sontag, Beyond the radical will (2006). [Shiro Takatani x Ryuichi Sakamoto, pp. 121–136]. Ed. Kyoto University of Art and Design + Mitsumura Suiko Shoin. 
 Dumb Type : OR, flipbook (2004). Ed. Lille 2004 European Capital of Culture
 Anomalie_digital arts n°2 : Digital Performance (Dec 2001/Jan 2002). [Keiko Courdy, Dumb Type: Un corps interface entre signal et noise, pp. 164–181]. Ed. HYX. 
 Icc Documents 1997–2000 (2001). [Dumb Type performance OR, pp. 86–95]. Ed. NTT Publishing. 
 memorandum – teiji furuhashi, Dumb Type (2000). Teiji Furuhashi's texts compiled by Dumb Type. Ed. Little More. 
 Half a Century of Japanese Theater: 1990s Part 2 (2000). Ed. Kinokuniya Company Ltd. 
 Information Design, series 6 (2000). [Toru Koyamada, Dumb Type, pp. 58–69]. Ed. Kadokawa Shoten Publishing. 
 ICC Concept Book - Exploring the Future of the Imagination (1997). [Dumb Type : installation OR, pp. 84–89]. Ed. NTT Publishing Co., Ltd. ASIN: B005QCKVW4
 Annual InterCommunication '95, InterCommunication Center (1995). [Takaaki Kumakura, The Performance Art of Dumb Type, pp. 48–55, Akira Asada Dying Pictures, Loving Pictures]. Ed. NTT Publishing Co., Ltd. ASIN: B00TH6Q7HS
 Dumb Type : pHase (1993). Ed. Wacoal Art Center, Tokyo	
 Stadsmarkering – Groningen, Marking the City Boundaries: The Books of Groningen, Paul Hefting and Camiel van Winkel (1990). [R: Akira Asada & Shiro Takatani, pp. 91–107]. Ed. Groningen: City Planning Department. 
 Plan for Sleep (1986). Cassette book. Ed. Dumb Type 
 Every Dog Has his Day (1985). Cassette book. Ed. Dumb Type

Catalogues of exhibitions 
 18th Japan Media Arts Festival Award-Winning Works (2015). [Art Division - What Are Media Arts (Media Geijutsu): Shiro Takatani].
 Art robotique (2014). Artistic curator Richard Castelli. Cité des sciences et de l'industrie / Art Book Magazine. 
 17th Japan Media Arts Festival Award-Winning Works (2013). [Art Division - In Pursuit of Art Piercing the Depths of Consciousness: Shiro Takatani].
 16th Japan Media Arts Festival Award-Winning Works (2013). [Art Division - Media Art, Inseparable from Its Epoch: Shiro Takatani].
 Camera Lucida, Takatani Shiro (2013). Tokyo Metropolitan Museum of Photography.
 Kyotographie - international photography festival (2014). [Mars, a photographic exploration, pp. 10–21]. 
 Kyotographie - international photography festival (2013). [pp. 48–53]. 
 Kichizaemon X, Raku Kichizaemon + Takatani Shiro (2012). Sagawa Art Museum.
 Art & Music – Search for New Synesthesia (2012). General Advisor Ryuichi Sakamoto, Chief Curator: Yuko Hasegawa. [Ono Seigen + Sakamoto Ryuichi + Takatani Shiro, pp. 98–101], [Sakamoto Ryuichi + Takatani Shiro, pp. 134–136]. Museum of Contemporary Art Tokyo. 
 Matière-Lumière (2011). Curator Richard Castelli. [Ryuichi Sakamoto + Shiro Takatani, pp. 118–127]. Béthune 2011 Capitale Régionale de la Culture. 
 Yebisu International Festival for Art & Alternative Visions 2010: Searching Songs, Keiko Okamura, Hiroko Tasaka, Masako Immaki, Jiro Iio (2010). Curator Keiko OKAMURA. Tokyo Metropolitan Museum of Photography.
 U-n-f-o-l-d: A Cultural Response to Climate Change, David Buckland, Chris Wainwright (2010). [pp. 92–95]. Springer Wien New York. 
 Ecology and Art - Thinking About the Earth Through Art: From Nearby to Far Away (2009). [pp. 20–21, 37]. Gunma Museum of Art, Tatebayashi
 Vom Funken zum Pixel (2007). Curator Richard Castelli. Berliner Festspiele / Martin-Gropius-Bau Berlin. [Shiro Takatani : Camera Lucida, Chrono]. Nicolai. 
 Body Media (2007). Curators Richard Castelli and Gong Yan. [pp. 136–145]. O Art Center
 LIFE-fluid, invisible, inaudible ... , Sakamoto Ryuichi + Takatani Shiro (2007). NTT Publishing Co., Ltd. 
 Rapt! : 20 contemporary artists from Japan (2006). Curators Yukihiro Hirayoshi, Shihoko Iida, Fumihiko Sumitomo. [Takatani Shiro in conversation with Philip Brophy, pp. 130–133, 186–189]. The Japan Foundation - Kokusai Koryu Kikin 
 Conversations with Snow and Ice (2005). [p. 45]. The Natural History Museum of Latvia 
 Cinémas du Futur (2004). Lille 2004 European Capital of Culture. Curator Richard Castelli. [Dumb Type: [OR] installation, pp. 28–29], [Shiro Takatani: frost frames, pp. 78–79]. Lille2004. 
 Cyber Asia – media art in the near future (2003). Hiroshima City Museum of Contemporary Art. [pp. 69–74]. 
 Dumb Type: Voyages, Minoru Hatanaka, Yukiko Shikata, Akira Asada (2002). NTT InterCommunication Center [ICC]. NTT Publishing Co. Ltd. 
 The 1st Valencia Biennial: Communication between the Arts, Luigi Settembrini (editor) (2002). [Fujiko Nakaya + Shiro Takatani]. Charta. 
 Gendai: Japanese Contemporary Art - Between the Body and Space (2000). The Centre of Contemporary Art, Ujazdowski Castle, Warsaw and The Japan Foundation. [pp. 76–81]
 vision.ruhr Kunst Medien Interaktion auf der Zeche Zollern Dortmund (2000). Museen der Stadt Dortmund. [pp. 176–179]
 Stanze e segreti (2000). Skira, Geneva-Milan. [pp. 70–85]
 Musiques en Scène (2000) Musée d'Art Contemporain de Lyon. [pp. 8–15]
 Donai Yanen! Et maintenant ! La création contemporaine au Japon (1998). École nationale supérieure des Beaux-Arts, Paris. [pp. 202–207]
 Japanese Art After 1945: Scream Against the Sky (1994). Curator Alexandra Munroe. The Guggenheim Museum and San Francisco Museum of Modern Art and The Japan Foundation. Harry N. Abrams, Inc. [pp. 305, 343, 358–359, 404]
 Japanese Art After 1945: Scream Against the Sky (1994). Curator Alexandra Munroe. Yokohama Museum of Art. [p. 184]
 Binaera: 14 Interaktionen - Kunst und Technologie (1993), Kunsthalle Wien, [Dumb Type, pp. 57–65, 160–163]
 Dumb Type : pH catalogue (1993). Wacoal Art Center, Tokyo
 L'ère binaire : nouvelles interactions - Musée communal d'Ixelles, Charles Hirsch, Michel Baudson et Ludion (1992), Brussels.  [Dumb Type by Barbara London, pp. 57–65, 160–163]. Ludion
 Mito Annual '93 Another World (1992). Art Tower Mito Contemporary Art Gallery [Dumb Type, pp. 86–89], [Yuko Hasegawa, Dumb Type, pp. 117–119]. 
 Zones of Love — Contemporary Art From Japan (1991). Museum of Contemporary Art, Sydney. [pp. 58–61]
 European Media Art Festival Osnabrück (1990) [Playback: a documentary of the performance Pleasure Life, p. 72] 
 pH Catalogue. 1990. Wacoal Art Center.
 Against Nature: Japanese Art in the Eighties (1989). Grey Art Gallery & Study Center, New York University, the MIT List Visual Arts Center and The Japan Foundation. [pp. 50–51, 78, 85]

Essays / Art Press 
 Shiro Takatani. The extension of visible: shapes of time, acoustic images & chromatic figures. Enrico Pitozzi. Digimag #82, (September 2013).
 BT: Monthly Art Magazine Bijutsu Techo - No. 886 (September 2006). [Shiro Takatani]. Bijutsu Shuppan Sha, Tokyo. .
 Stadmenschen in Medienlandschaften. Eiichiro Hirata. Theater der Zeit, Nr.9. (September 2006). [pp. 13–14]
 BT: Monthly Art Magazine Bijutsu Techo - No. 849 (May 2004). [Dumb Type, Takayuki Fujimoto, Teiji Furuhashi, Ryoji Ikeda, Toru Koyamada, Shiro Takatani]. Bijutsu Shuppan Sha, Tokyo..
 Meditations on Space and Time: The Performance Art of Japan's Dumb Type. Dorinda Neave. Art Journal, Vol. 60 (Spring 2001). [pp. 84–93]
 Diatxt. 01 (2000). [Shiro Takatani, Dumb type]. Kyoto Art Center, Kyoto.
 Dumb Type, Landmark Hall, Yokohama. Judy Annear. ART + TEXT, Number 51 (1995). [p. 73]

Audio / visual Documentaries 
 Shiro Takatani, between nature and technology (2019). A 52-minute documentary film directed by Giulio Boato, in Japanese, French, English, with French subtitles, including interviews with Shiro Takatani, Ryuichi Sakamoto, Ryoji Ikeda, Simon Fisher Turner. Production: Idéale Audience. World premiere at the FIFA competition - International Festival of Films on Art in Montreal.
 Event Documentation by AAA Hong Kong Staff: October 2009 (2009). Asia Art Archive, Hong Kong.
 Musiques en scène, Trans/Formes (2000), radio documentary by Alexandre Castant. With James Giroudon, Pierre Alain Jaffrennou, Ulf Langheinrich (Granular-Synthesis), Micha Laury, Thierry Raspail, Shiro Takatani (Dumb Type). France Culture, Paris, 30 min. 
 Arte Video Night 2009. Thème 5 : Entendre. Memorandum by Dumb Type
 Cycle création contemporaine au Japon : Dumb Type (DVD, 1998), documentary by Gilles Coudert (16 min. / Japanese version with French/English subtitles). Copyright: Triac documentaire, cop. 1998. Arte / Metropolis. apres production, collection Kaleidoscope (2008)

References

External links 
 Official website - Shiro Takatani
 Official website - Dumb Type
 Epidemic productions website
 Cape Farewell - Shiro Takatani blog
 Discogs - Dumb Type
 Asia Art Archive - Shiro Takatani
 Asia Art Archive - Dumb Type

Japanese contemporary artists
1963 births
Living people
People from Kyoto